Maria Gevorgyan (born 21 December 1994) is an Armenian chess player who holds the title of Woman Grandmaster (WGM, 2019). She is a four-time Armenian Women Chess Champion (2016, 2017, 2019, 2020).

Chess career
At age three learn to play chess from grandfather, sports journalist Derenik Gevorgyan. From the age of seven Maria has attended chess school and then chess academy. In 2011 in Albena she placed 3rd in European Youth Chess Championship in girls U18 category. In 2012 Maria won Armenia Chess Championship in girls U18 category and 12th individual European Youth Chess Rapid Championship in girls U18 category.

In 2014 and 2015 Maria was the Armenian Women Chess Vice-champion. In the 71st Armenian Chess Championship in 2016 she has scored 8.5 points out of 9 and won the tournament. In January 2017, Maria scored 6½ points out of 9, again became the women's champion of Armenia. Also she won Armenian Women's Chess Championship in 2019 and 2020.

References

External links

1994 births
Living people
Sportspeople from Yerevan
Armenian female chess players
Chess Woman International Masters
20th-century Armenian women
21st-century Armenian women